KCAP may refer to:

 KCAP (AM), a radio station (950 AM) licensed to Helena, Montana, United States
 KCAP (1340 AM), a former radio station (1340 AM) licensed to Helena, Montana, which operated from 1949 to 2014
 KZMT, a radio station (101.1 FM) licensed to Helena, Montana, United States, which used the call sign KCAP-FM from 1975 to 1984